U S Mallya Indoor Stadium is situated at Mangalore in India. It offers sporting facilities for Badminton and Basketball. The stadium is named after U. Srinivas Mallya.

Events
 This stadium had hosted the All India Badminton Tournament in 2019.

References 

Buildings and structures in Mangalore
Sport in Mangalore
Sports venues in Karnataka
Year of establishment missing